A floating launch vehicle operations platform is a marine vessel used for launch or landing operations of an orbital launch vehicle by a launch service provider: putting satellites into orbit around Earth or another celestial body, or recovering first-stage boosters from orbital-class flights by making a propulsive landing on the platform.

In the early decades of spaceflight technology, all orbital launch vehicle operations were exclusively from land, and all booster stages were expended after a single use for nearly 60 years after the first orbital spaceflight, Sputnik 1.
After the late 1990s and into the 2010s, new marine options for launch were built.  Landing of orbital-class boosters began to be accomplished in 2015.  More platforms, both for launch and landing, are currently in construction or planned.  

Suborbital rockets and ballistic missiles had been launched from marine platforms earlier than the 1990s, but are not the topic of this article.

Platforms to date 

Both floating launch platform and floating landing platforms have been placed into use by orbital launch service providers as of 2020. Additionally, at least two new rocket landing platforms and one new launch platform are under construction as of 2020.

There are currently at least five instances of marine launch or landing platforms:
 Odyssey used by Sea Launch for equatorial Pacific Ocean launches of the Zenit-3 rocket from 1999 to 2014, where a total of 36 rocket launches were made.
 Several Autonomous spaceport drone ships are used by SpaceX to recover and reuse first-stage boosters of its Falcon rocket family. By late 2020, there were approximately 80 booster landings on three different drone ships, all since 2016.
 The Chinese government launched a solid-rocket propelled smallsat payload massing  into orbit during 2019 using a -long repurposed military ballistic missile technology. 
 The Blue Origin landing platform ship Jacklyn is undergoing refit in Pensacola, Florida to prepare for underway ship landings of the booster stage of a new launch vehicle, the Blue Origin New Glenn, aiming to become the second launch provider to achieve partial reusability of an orbital booster rocket.
 SpaceX had planned in 2021 to build two floating launch platforms, Phobos and Deimos for their second-generation Starship system. Two deepwater oil rigs were procured in July 2020, and as of 2021, modifications are underway on the two ships in the Port of Brownsville and Port of Galveston. Plans were for both the first stage (Super Heavy) booster and the second stage (Starship) to be landed on land, unlike the many sea landings seen with their Falcon 9 boosters. However, these plans were shelved and the rigs were sold by SpaceX in 2023.

In addition to the historical and current platforms, other entities have considered utilizing a floating landing platform.  
 Rocket Lab announced in March 2021 that they are building their new medium-lift launch vehicle—Neutron—to land the first stage booster on an ocean landing platform. However, the company later announced in a December 2021 update that the rocket would instead return to its launch site, removing the need for any ocean platforms.
 In June 2021, Astra was evaluating ocean launch platforms as part of their company strategy to have more than a dozen launch locations to support a daily smallsat launch cadence by 2025.

History

Floating launch platforms 
Orbital launch platforms were initially modified ships, but specific platforms were later produced specifically to be orbital launch vessels.

The concept was pioneered in the late 1990s by a US, Russian, Norwegian and Ukrainian commercial consortium. The Chinese space agency did their first orbital launch from a ship in 2019. It was unclear if the shipboard launch was a special demonstration mission, or if China was putting a new launch service provider capability into place.

Floating landing platforms 
All early orbital launch vehicle stages were expended, the booster stages were destroyed when re-entering the atmosphere or on impact with the ground or ocean. After over four years of research and technology development, SpaceX first landed Falcon 9 boosters on land in 2015, on a floating landing platform in 2016, and has been reusing boosters routinely since 2017, with most of the recovered boosters landing on a platform at sea.

After attempts to land orbital rocket booster stages by parachute failed in the late 2000s, SpaceX began to develop reusable technology in the early 2010s, when they contracted with a Louisiana shipyard to build a floating landing platform to land their launch vehicles. The platform had an approximately  landing pad surface and was capable of precision positioning with diesel-powered azimuth thrusters so the platform can hold its position for launch vehicle landing. This platform was first deployed in January 2015 when SpaceX attempted a controlled descent flight test to land the first stage of Falcon 9 flight 14 on a solid surface after it was used to loft a contracted payload toward Earth orbit. The platform utilizes GPS position information to navigate and hold its precise position.
SpaceX CEO Elon Musk first displayed a photograph of the newly designated "autonomous spaceport drone ship" in November 2014. The ship is designed to hold position to within , even under storm conditions.

On 8 April 2016, the first stage of the rocket that launched the  spacecraft ahead of CRS-8, successfully landed on the drone ship named Of Course I Still Love You, the first successful landing of a rocket booster on a floating platform.
By early 2018, SpaceX had two operational drone ships and had a third under construction.  By September 2018, sea platform landings had become routine for the SpaceX launch vehicles, with over 23 attempted and 17 successful recoveries.

, Blue Origin is intending to make the first stage boosters of New Glenn be reusable, and recover launched boosters on the Atlantic Ocean, downrange of their Florida launch site, via a stabilized ship that is underway, acting as a moving floating landing platform. The hydrodynamically-stabilized ship is projected to increase the likelihood of successful recovery in rough seas.  

In October 2018, the ship was disclosed to be the LPV, built in 2004 as a roll-on/roll-off cargo ship.  The LPV was undergoing refit in 2018–2019 in Pensacola, Florida.

Operation 
Floating platforms have the benefit of being able to receive or launch space launch vehicles out on the open ocean to keep the operation away from populated areas, for reasons of safety.

Floating launch platforms can be moved substantial distances across the ocean, to be repositioned for launches. I 

The use of a floating launch platform allows for the rocket to be positioned more easily than with a fixed launch pad on land. For example, Sea Launch moved their platform closer to Earth's equator to gain a bit of extra momentum and gain additional performance from the rocket. The Chinese Long March 11 did something similar for its 2019 sea launch.

References 

Emerging technologies
Spaceflight technology
Watercraft
Sea launch to orbit